Carole Corbeil (1952 – 2000) was a Canadian arts critic and novelist. Born in Montreal to Québécois parents, her writing was often informed by the cultural displacement, and the subsequent sense of dual belonging, that she experienced when her parents divorced and her mother remarried to an anglophone man.

Biography
Corbeil was raised and educated exclusively in French in childhood, and later transferred to a private English school, Miss Edgar's and Miss Cramp's School, after her mother's remarriage. She spent some time as a teenager studying in Wales under the International Baccalaureate program, before undertaking university studies at York University in Toronto.

First known as an arts reporter for The Globe and Mail in the 1980s, she published her debut novel Voice-Over in 1992. The novel centred on a documentary filmmaker from Quebec from her childhood through to her adult relationship with an English Canadian poet; although it included passages in both English and French, critics praised its code switching as "done in such a clever way that the French is understandable to a person with only the basic vocabulary." Voice-Over was a shortlisted nominee for the Books in Canada First Novel Award and the Trillium Book Award, and was a co-winner with David Donnell's China Blues of the Toronto Book Award, in 1993.

In the 1990s, she wrote a weekly arts column for the Toronto Star. She was also a contributor to This Magazine, Canadian Art and Saturday Night, and won two National Magazine Awards for her writing.

She published her second novel, In the Wings, in 1997. The novel centred on the relationship between Allan O'Brien and Alice Riverton, actors playing Hamlet and Gertrude in a stage production of Hamlet. A stage adaptation of In the Wings by Nicky Guadagni was staged by Toronto's Theatre Passe Muraille in 2002.

Corbeil was married to actor Layne Coleman. Their daughter, Charlotte Corbeil-Coleman, would later become an actor and playwright.

Corbeil died in Toronto in 2000 of cancer.

References

1952 births
2000 deaths
Canadian art critics
20th-century Canadian novelists
Canadian women novelists
Journalists from Montreal
Writers from Montreal
French Quebecers
Canadian women journalists
20th-century Canadian women writers
Canadian literary critics
Women literary critics
Canadian theatre critics
People educated at Atlantic College
Canadian women non-fiction writers
York University alumni